The Mistral G-200 is a Swiss aircraft engine, designed and produced by Mistral Engines of Geneva for use in light aircraft.

Design and development
The engine is a twin-rotor, 2X3X displacement, liquid-cooled, gasoline Wankel engine design, with an integral mechanical gearbox reduction drive with a reduction ratio of 2.82:1. It employs dual electronic ignition systems and produces .

Specifications (G-200)

See also

References

External links

Mistral aircraft engines
Pistonless rotary engine